The Society for Renaissance Studies is an academic society whose aim is to provide a forum for all those interested in studying the Renaissance. It pursues this though various meetings and publications and providing this and other support for interdisciplinary teaching and research. The society was formed in 1967 with a founding general meeting being held at the Institute of Historical Research. This meeting was chaired by the noted art historian Ernst Gombrich and amongst those participating was Kenneth Clark.

Its major publication is Renaissance Studies.

Chairs 
The past and current chairs of the society include the following:
 1967-1970 Peter Murray 
 1970-1973 Nicolai Rubinstein
 1973-1976 John Hale 
 1976-1980 Margaret Mann Phillips 
 1980-1983 Dominic Baker-Smith
 1983-1986 Peter Burke 
 1986-1989 Sydney Anglo 
 1989-1992 Robert Knecht 
 1992-1995 Susan Foister 
 1995-1998 Francis Ames-Lewis 
 1998-2001 Gordon Campbell
 2001-2004 David Chambers 
 2004-2007 Brian Vickers 
 2007-2010 John Law
 2010-2013 Judith Bryce

References

External links 
 

Historical societies of the United Kingdom
Organizations established in 1967